Krndija is a village in eastern Croatia, part of the municipality of Punitovci, population 64 (2011).

References

Populated places in Osijek-Baranja County